Ryan Mougenel (born March 2, 1976) is a Canadian former professional ice hockey right winger. , he is the head coach of the Providence Bruins of the American Hockey League.

Mougenel played six seasons of professional ice hockey, including winning the 2003 Kelly Cup as a member of the Atlantic City Boardwalk Bullies.  Mougenel is also a member of a business trio with NHLers Keith and Wayne Primeau, operating the Durham Hockey Institute in Toronto and owning the Whitby Fury of the Central Canadian Hockey League.

Playing career

Junior career 
Mougenel began his junior career in 1993 with the Owen Sound Platers.  Mougenel would appear in 53 games and score 3 goals and 8 assists in his rookie season.  The following season, Mougenel increased his output, scoring 11 goals and 18 assists in 66 games.  In the 1995–96 season, Owen Sound would trade Mougenel to the Kitchener Rangers three games into the season.

Mougenel saw an explosion in production with Kitchener, scoring 30 goals and 24 assists in 60 games in the regular season and added eight goals and five assists in 12 playoff games in his first season with the team.  In his final juniors season, Mougenel recorded 38 goals and 33 assists in 61 games for Kitchener during the regular season and scored five goals and four assists in 13 playoff games, as Kitchener reached the J. Ross Robertson Cup semifinals.

Professional career 
In his first professional career, Mougenel bounced between four teams and two leagues, appearing for the Hampton Roads Admirals (4 points in 7 games) and Chesapeake Icebreakers (6 points in 7 games) of the East Coast Hockey League and the Quebec Rafales (5 points in 13 games) and the Cleveland Lumberjacks (8 points in 37 games) of the International Hockey League.

Mougenel would return with Cleveland during the 1997–98 season, scoring five goals and seven assists in 45 games with the Lumberjacks before making a return to Chesapeake of the ECHL.  Mougenel would appear in Chesapeake's final eight regular season games, scoring two goals and three assists, and would play in two playoff games scoring one goal.

Mougenel would spend the 1999–00 season with the Rochester Americans of the American Hockey League, appearing in 20 games and scoring one goal with the team.  Mougenel would spend the next two seasons with the Jackson Bandits of the ECHL, appearing in 105 games and scoring 26 goals and 29 assists during his tenure in Jackson.  Mougenel's final season of professional hockey came with the Atlantic City Boardwalk Bullies.  Mougenel would score 15 goals and 20 assists in 53 regular season games and scored one goal and eight assists for Atlantic City, as they won the Kelly Cup in five games over the Columbia Inferno.

International career 
Mougenel was a member of the Canadian national men's ice hockey team from 1999–2000.  Mougenel would appear in 27 games with Team Canada, scoring 2 goals and 11 assists.

Coaching career

Early coaching positions 
Mougenel joined Matt Thomas' staff on the Fresno Falcons in 2005 as an assistant.  Mougenel would serves as Thomas' assistant with Fresno until the team folded midway through the 2008–09 season and rejoined Thomas as an assistant when Thomas was named the mid-season replacement for Chris Cichocki, who had been fired by the Stockton Thunder midway through the 2008–09 season.

Las Vegas Wranglers 
In June 2009 the Las Vegas Wranglers announced that they had hired former Mougenel to be the second head coach and general manager in team history after the previous head coach, Glen Gulutzan left to become the head coach of the AHL's Texas Stars. Mougenel was officially introduced at Orleans Arena on June 30.

Mougenel early decisions as head coach and general manager were to bring in former NHL All-Star Keith Primeau to take over as the team's director of player development as well as being a special assistant to the general manager. and sever the team's ties with the Calgary Flames, who had been Las Vegas' NHL affiliate since the team's inaugural season in 2003. Mougenel stated that cost of travel between Las Vegas and Abbotsford, British Columbia (site of Calgary's newly relocated AHL affiliate) and immigration issues from Canada played large roles in the decision to separate. Mougenel announced that he signed an agreement to become the ECHL affiliate of the Phoenix Coyotes and Phoenix's AHL affiliate, the San Antonio Rampage.

During the 2010–11 season, Mougenel was named the head coach of the ECHL All-Stars for the 2011 ECHL All-Star Game.

Hershey Bears 
Mougenel became assistant head coach for the Hershey Bears, AHL affiliate of the Washington Capitals on July 5, 2013 and filled as head coach in for one game on January 26, 2014, while the head coach was ill.

Worcester Sharks 
On July 29, 2014, Mougenel left the Bears to become assistant head coach for the Worcester Sharks, AHL affiliate of the San Jose Sharks

Personal 
On July 12, 2012, Mougenel jumped into the Boston Harbor to rescue a man who was drowning in the harbor and helped bring the man to dry land.  The unknown victim was rushed to Massachusetts General Hospital.

Career statistics

Coaching career

References

External links 

1976 births
Atlantic City Boardwalk Bullies players
Canadian ice hockey right wingers
Chesapeake Icebreakers players
Cleveland Lumberjacks players
ECHL coaches
Hampton Roads Admirals players
Jackson Bandits players
Kitchener Rangers players
Las Vegas Wranglers
Owen Sound Platers players
Quebec Rafales players
Rochester Americans players
Living people
Sportspeople from Scarborough, Toronto
Ice hockey people from Toronto
Canadian ice hockey coaches